Demon Days: Live at the Manchester Opera House is a live DVD by Gorillaz, released 27 March 2006 in the UK (see 2006 in British music). It compiles the live performances from 1 to 5 November 2005 at the Manchester Opera House that recreated the Demon Days studio album and was directed by David Barnard and Grant Gee.

Nearly all of the album's performers were available to participate in the event, including Neneh Cherry, Bootie Brown, Shaun Ryder and Ike Turner. MF Doom and Dennis Hopper appeared through video and audio narration, respectively. Local Manchester choirs were hired for the performances.

Included as an encore are "Hong Kong", a song written for the War Child album Help!: A Day in the Life, and "Latin Simone (¿Qué Pasa Contigo?)" from the Gorillaz album, as a tribute to the memory of Ibrahim Ferrer, who died before the event took place. Also included are the visuals seen on the large screen for all but three of the performances, as those songs featured single cover art for the duration of each respective song. The visuals for "Kids with Guns" are the contribution by the "Search for a Star" video winner "Carlos".

During the performance, 2-D and Murdoc appeared (as puppets) in a box and were motioning for the encore toward the end.

The live performances in Manchester were a pre-festival commission for the Manchester International Festival, which took place in 2007.
The DVD peaked at number 1 on the UK DVD charts.

The film was nominated for a Grammy Award for Best Music Film.

In 2011, an audio-only version of the show was released on Spotify.

Track listing
"Intro" – 1:11
"Last Living Souls" – 3:21
"Kids with Guns" (featuring Neneh Cherry) – 4:04
"O Green World" – 5:17
"Dirty Harry" (featuring Bootie Brown) – 4:00
"Feel Good Inc." (featuring De La Soul) – 3:56
"El Mañana" – 4:07
"Every Planet We Reach Is Dead" (featuring Ike Turner) – 5:30
"November Has Come" (featuring DOOM) (footage) – 2:58
"All Alone" (featuring Roots Manuva and Martina Topley-Bird) – 3:52
"White Light" – 2:26
"Dare" (featuring Roses Gabor and Shaun Ryder) – 4:38
"Fire Coming Out of the Monkey's Head" – Read by Dennis Hopper – 3:32
"Don't Get Lost in Heaven" (featuring The London Community Gospel Choir) – 2:07
"Demon Days" (featuring The London Community Gospel Choir) – 4:52
"Hong Kong" (featuring Zeng Zhen) – 6:37
"Latin Simone (¿Qué Pasa Contigo?)" (featuring Ibrahim Ferrer) (footage) – 3:53

Personnel
 Vocals/piano/melodica – Damon Albarn
 MD/keyboards – Mike Smith
 Guitar – Simon Tong
 Guitar – Simon Jones
 Bass – Morgan Nicholls
 Drums – Cass Browne
 Percussion - Karl Vanden Bossche
 Turntable – Darren Galea

Backing vocalists
 Wayne Hernandez
 Sharlene Hector
 Rosie Wilson
 Wendi Rose
 Aaron Sokell

String section
 Cello – Isabelle Dunn
 Cello – Dan Keane
 Bass – Emma Smith
 Viola – Amanda Drummond
 Viola – Nina Kapinsky
 Violin – Antonia Pagulatos
 Violin – Jennifer Berman
 Violin – Kirsty Mangan
 Viola – Gary Pomeroy
 Cello – Deborah Chandler

Guests
 Neneh Cherry – Guest vocals on "Kids with Guns"
 Bootie Brown – Guest rap on "Dirty Harry"
 De La Soul – Guest raps on "Feel Good Inc"
 Ike Turner – Guest piano on "Every Planet We Reach is Dead"
 MF Doom – Guest rap on "November Has Come"
 Roots Manuva – Guest rap on "All Alone"
 Martina Topley-Bird – Guest vocals on "All Alone"
 Rosie Wilson – Guest vocals on "Dare"
 Shaun Ryder – Guest vocals on "Dare"
 Dennis Hopper – Spoken word vocals on "Fire Coming Out of the Monkey's Head"
 The London Community Gospel Choir – Guest vocals on "Don't Get Lost in Heaven" and "Demon Days"
 Zeng Zhen – guest guzheng on "Hong Kong:
 Ibrahim Ferrer – Guest vocals on "Latin Simone (¿Qué Pasa Contigo?)"

Charts

Certifications

Release history
The DVD was released in various countries:

References

External links
Gorillaz-Unofficial DVD webpage

Entire video available online

Gorillaz albums
2006 live albums
2006 video albums
Live video albums
Parlophone live albums
Parlophone video albums
Virgin Records live albums
Virgin Records video albums
Albums produced by Damon Albarn